A tower is a tall human-made structure.

Tower may also refer to:

Types of towers
 Air traffic control tower
 Bell tower
 Cell tower, a cellular telephone communications site
 Clock tower
 Computer tower
 Conning tower
 Cooling tower
 Drop tower, an amusement park ride
 Fire lookout tower
 Fortified tower
 Interlocking tower or control cabin, directs railroad traffic
 Lattice tower or truss tower
 Martello tower, a small defensive fort
 Office tower
 Peel tower, a small fortified keep or tower house
 Radio tower
 Siege tower or breaching tower
 Telecommunications tower (disambiguation)
 Television tower
 Tower houses in the Balkans, tower houses built in the Balkans
 Transmission tower, used for electric power transmission
 Watchtower, a type fortification used in many parts of the world
 Water tower

Places

Geography
 Tower (ward), ward of the City of London, England
 Tower, County Cork, Ireland
 Tower, Michigan, United States
 Tower, Minnesota, United States
 Tower Branch, a stream in Pennsylvania, United States

Buildings with the name
 Tower of London, also known as "The Tower"
 Towers (Boston University), a dormitory at Boston University
 Trump Tower, a mixed use commercial and residential building in New York City

People
 Tower (surname), also Towers (surname)

Arts, entertainment, media and sports

Fictional entities
 Tower (Code Lyoko), element of virtual world in animated TV series
 Tower (comics), a Marvel Comics character

Music
 Tower (album), an album by the Finnish rock band Circle featuring Verde
 , a 1980s Dutch Symphonic Rock band 
 "Towers", a song by Little Mix

Other uses in arts, entertainment, and media
 Tower (2012 Canadian film), directed by Kazik Radwanski
 Tower (2016 film), about the 1966 shootings at the University of Texas at Austin
 "Towers", an episode of the television series Teletubbies
 The Tower (Tarot card)

Sports
 Hamburg Towers, German basketball team
 London Towers, former English basketball team

Brands and enterprises
 Alton Towers, a theme park and resort located in Staffordshire, England
 Tower Comics
 Tower International
 Tower Records (music retailer)
 Tower Records (record label)
 TOWER Software
 Towers Department Stores, Canada
 Tower Semiconductor, Israel

Mathematics
 Tower of fields, a sequence of field extensions
 Tower of objects, in category theory
 Tower of powers, nested exponentiation

Organizations
 Hamburg Towers, German basketball club
 Princeton Tower Club, an eating club at Princeton University
 Tower Transit, a bus operating company in London since 2013 owned by Transit Systems
 Tower Transit Singapore, a bus operating company in Singapore since June 2016 owned by Transit Systems

Other uses
 Tower (typeface)

See also
 List of leaning towers
 Tall buildings in London
 The Tower (disambiguation)
 The Towers (disambiguation)
 Tower blocks in Great Britain
 Tower City (disambiguation)